Dudley Walker Morton (July 17, 1907 – October 11, 1943), nicknamed "Mushmouth" or "Mush", was a submarine commander of the United States Navy during World War II. He was commander of the  during its third through seventh patrols. Wahoo was one of the most-celebrated submarines of World War II, as it sank at least 19 Japanese ships, more than any other submarine of the time. Morton and Wahoo disappeared in 1943 during a transit of La Pérouse Strait. He was legally declared deceased three years later.

Early life
Morton was born in Owensboro, Kentucky, on July 17, 1907. He graduated from the United States Naval Academy in 1930. There he received the nickname "Mushmouth", after a character in the cartoon strip Moon Mullins whose large square jaw and prominent mouth resembled Morton's. The nickname was shortened to "Mush", by which he was known for much of his life. One of his classmates was Lance Edward Massey.

Naval career
Morton was promoted to lieutenant commander on October 15, 1942, and was in nominal command of  while it underwent extended repairs at Pearl Harbor. Morton took command of Wahoo on December 31 in Brisbane, Australia. Between January 26, 1943 and October 11, he carried out four offensive patrols, during which Wahoo was responsible for sinking 19 cargo and transport ships for a combined total of 55,000 tons.

Buyo Maru incident
During Wahoos third war patrol, Morton was responsible for an incident which resulted in shipwrecked soldiers in about twenty lifeboats of sunken Japanese transport Buyo Maru being fired on while in the water. The transport was torpedoed by Wahoo on 26 January 1943. Morton was responsible for ordering the machine gunning of the shipwrecked survivors in the water. Morton and his executive officer, Richard O'Kane, had misidentified the survivors as solely Japanese. In fact, they were mainly Indian POWs of 2nd Battalion, 16th Punjab Regiment, plus escorting forces from the Japanese 26th Field Ordnance Depot.

O'Kane's account describes Morton explaining that he should prevent enemy troops from getting ashore to fight again - as each one of them could cost an American life. However, the Hague Convention of 1907 bans the killing of shipwreck survivors under any circumstances. O'Kane further explained that the fire from Wahoo was intended to force the troops to abandon their boats and no troops were deliberately targeted. Vice Admiral Charles A. Lockwood, the Commander of the Submarine Force for the U.S. Pacific Fleet (COMSUBPAC) asserted that the survivors were army troops and turned machinegun and rifle fire on Wahoo while she maneuvered on the surface. He further stated that such resistance was common in submarine warfare. In 1975, historian Clay Blair claimed Morton opened fire first and the shipwrecked returned fire with handguns.

Disappearance
After three arduous war patrols, Morton was given the highly dangerous assignment of penetrating the Sea of Japan for the second time, in October 1943. Morton was reported missing in action that December, when his submarine was presumed lost. After the war, it was determined from Japanese records that, on October 11, in the time frame in which the Wahoo was expected to exit through La Pérouse Strait, an antisubmarine aircraft found a surfaced submarine and attacked, dropping three depth charges.

Declared deceased on January 7, 1946, Morton's decorations included the Navy Cross with three gold stars in lieu of a second, third, and fourth awards, and the Army Distinguished Service Cross. 
O'Kane believed the Buyo Maru POW shootings prevented Morton from being awarded the Medal of Honor. The destroyer  was named in his honor.

Summary of war patrols
With six war patrols, Morton ranked third among the Navy's top skippers, credited with 19 ships and 54,683 tons sunk, per JANAC (alternatively recorded as 17 ships/100,400 tons, per Blair)

In popular culture
In 1960, Vice Admiral Charles A. Lockwood, Jr., ComSubPac during World War II, was asked to write the foreword for former Wahoo crewmember Forest Sterling's book, Wake of the Wahoo. He wrote about Morton: "When a natural leader and born daredevil such as Mush Morton is given command of a submarine, the result can only be a fighting ship of the highest order, with officers and men who would follow their skipper to the Gates of Hell... And they did." Added Lockwood: "Morton lined up an impressive number of 'firsts' during the short ten months that he commanded Wahoo: first to penetrate an enemy harbor and sink a ship therein; first to use successfully a down the throat shot; and first to wipe out an entire convoy single-handed."

In Herman Wouk's novel War and Remembrance, and the mini-series based on it, the Buyo Maru incident is prominently fictionalized as a scene for a major character's development.

Awards and decorations

Notes

References

External links

 history.navy.mil: USS Morton
USS Morton website biography
Page on the third patrol controversy on warfish.com, a site about Wahoo
Geneva Convention Article 16
Submarine atrocities(Archived 2009-10-25)

1907 births
1943 deaths
People from Owensboro, Kentucky
United States Navy officers
United States Naval Academy alumni
Recipients of the Navy Cross (United States)
Recipients of the Distinguished Service Cross (United States)
United States submarine commanders
United States Navy personnel killed in World War II
Missing in action of World War II
Deaths by airstrike during World War II